Sylvia Nagginda (born 9 November 1962) is the current Nnabagereka or Queen of Buganda, a historic kingdom in modern-day Uganda.

Background
Nagginda was born in England in 1962 to John Mulumba Luswata of Nkumba, Entebbe and Rebecca Nakintu Musoke and returned to Uganda shortly thereafter to be raised by her grandparents of the Omusu Clan. She is the granddaughter of George William Musoke and Nora Musoke of Nnazigo, Kyaggwe, and Omutaka Nelson Nkalubo Sebugwawo and Catherine Sebugwawo of Nkumba. She has three brothers and three sisters.

Timeline
Sylvia attended Lake Victoria Primary School, in Entebbe, Gayaza Junior School, and Wanyange Girls School. After graduating from secondary school she went to the United States to continue her studies. She earned an associate degree with honours from City University of New York, a Bachelor of Arts degree from New York University, and a Master of Arts degree with Distinction in Mass Communication from the New York Institute of Technology.

Work experience
Sylvia went on to work as a Public Information Officer and Research Consultant at the United Nations headquarters in New York, as a proposal writer with Maximus Inc., and as an independent consultant in public relations and business development with various firms. She has applied her skills in fields such as public information, economic research, health care and human services, and international non-profit activities. She is one of the founders of the African Queens and Women Cultural Leaders Network, whose primary focus is the "improvement of the lives of women and children in Africa". Collaborating organizations include the African Union, the United Nations, and African governments.

The Nnaabagereka supports the Kabaka's Education Fund in assisting to make education available to the least advantaged children through a scholarship scheme. She stresses the need for high quality education accessible to all children and relevant to the needs of society.

The Nnabagereka places special emphasis on the education of girls, as witnessed through her work as a Goodwill Ambassador for UNFPA, advocating for girls' education; She is also involved with the Forum for African Women Educationalists an organization whose goal is to accelerate female participation in education and to bridge the gender gap within the education system at all levels. The Nnabagereka is very cautious about the cultural values that make a good mother or woman in Buganda, but stresses that these should be handled in such a way that girls are not denied any opportunity in education.

As Queen, Sylvia has worked to raise awareness of the value of educating girls. She endorses abstinence from premarital sex to avoid HIV/AIDS and has tried to reduce the stigma of those living with the disease. The Queen is the patron of various organizations and heads the Nnaabagereka Development Trust Foundation. She has also spearheaded immunization campaigns against measles, polio, tetanus, and other diseases. She also established the Kampala Ballet and Modern Dance School, the first of its kind in Uganda.

Through her  Nabagereka Foundation, Queen Nagginda's  Ekisakaate summer camp has groomed more than 30,000 Ugandan youth since 2008. The camp takes place every January and admits youth between 13 and 18 years. 

"Ekisakaate kya Nabagereka" meaning the queen's camp, emphasizes Buganda culture. Teenagers are taught skills including peeling matooke, greeting in Buganda culture, dancing the kiganda dance among other activities.

Mentors are also called upon to address the teenagers who look up to them. Jennifer Musisi, Robert Kyaglanyi Ssentamu , Juliana Kanyomozi are among some of the mentors to grace the ekisakaate camp in recent times.

Personal life
After living in the United States for 18 years, Sylvia returned to Uganda. In 1998 she became romantically involved with her long-time acquaintance Muwenda Mutebi II of Buganda. Their engagement was announced on 14 February 1999. On 27 August of that year, she married the King at St. Paul's Cathedral on Namirembe Hill, becoming the first queen of Buganda in fifty years. On 4 July 2001 in London, the Queen delivered her first child, Princess Katrina Sarah Ssangalyambogo, which means "buffalo's horn". She is also step-mother to the King's other children.

See also
 Kingdom of Buganda
 Kabaka of Buganda
 Mutebi II of Buganda

References

External links
 A Modern Queen In A Traditional Role: Nnabagereka Sylvia Nagginda - 7 September 2005
 Spotlight on Queen of Buganda – Sylvia Nagginda

African queens
1964 births
Living people
New York University alumni
City University of New York alumni
Buganda
New York Institute of Technology alumni
Ugandan emigrants to the United Kingdom
Ugandan emigrants to the United States
Princesses by marriage